Edward Webster (ante 1691 - 1755) was Member of the Parliament of Ireland for Carysfort from 1717 to 1727 and Chief Secretary to The Duke of Bolton
as Lord Lieutenant of Ireland from 1717 to 1720.

References

1755 deaths
Chief Secretaries for Ireland
Irish MPs 1715–1727
Members of the Privy Council of Ireland
Members of the Parliament of Ireland (pre-1801) for County Wicklow constituencies
1691 births